Aizsargi (literally: "Defenders", "Guards") was a volunteer paramilitary organization or militia ("Guards Organization", AO) in Latvia during the interbellum period (1918–1939). The Aizsargi was created on March 30, 1919, by the Latvian Provisional Government as a self-defense force, a kind of National Guard, during the Latvian War of Independence. In 1921 it was reorganized to follow the example of the Finnish Suojeluskunta (known as the "White Guard").

The Aizsargi published a newspaper, entitled  ("Defender"/"Guard"), and the movement had subsidiary sections for women ("") and youth ("").

The organization was among those which militarily supported the 1934 coup d'état of Kārlis Ulmanis.

By 1 January 1940 the organization had a membership of 60,684: 31,874 guards (aizsargi), 14,810 women members (aizsardzes), and 14,000 youth members (jaunsargu). The organization consisted of 19 infantry regiments and the separate Railroad and Aviation Regiments.

On 16 June 1940 the organization was disbanded as a result of the Soviet occupation of Latvia in 1940. During the Soviet occupation, the former members of the AO were heavily persecuted.

After the restoration of the independence of Latvia, the Aizsargi organization was not re-established by the government, as the Latvian National Guard was formed in 1991 as the main volunteer defence force of the country. Since then, separate small-scale NGOs have claimed to be the successors of the original AO, which sometimes espoused fringe political views (e.g. the group led by Jānis Rība and others).

References 

Anti-communist organisations in Latvia
Military history of Latvia
Paramilitary organisations based in Latvia